The Rwandan Amateur Basketball Federation is the governing body of basketball in Rwanda. It operates the Rwanda national basketball team as well as the top-tier NBL and other amateur leagues.

History
In 1930, basketball was first brought to Rwanda by catholic priests and the first games were played in high schools in the South Province. After the independence in 1962, new teams were created in the army and from some public institutions. In 1974, the Rwandan Basketball Federation was created and the first national league started three years later.

References

External links
Official website

Sports organizations established in 1974
Basketball
Basketball in Rwanda
National members of FIBA Africa
1974 establishments in Rwanda